James Symington may refer to:

James W. Symington (born 1927), U.S. Congressman representing Missouri (1969–1977)
James H. Symington (1913–1987), religious leader of the Exclusive Brethren
James Ayton Symington (1856–1939), English book and magazine illustrator
James Symington, Canadian police officer, handler of 9/11 hero dog Trakr